Vizianagaram district is one of the six districts in the Uttarandhra  region of the Indian state of Andhra Pradesh with its headquarters located at Vizianagaram. The district was once the part of ancient Kalinga.Saripilli Dibbilingeswara temple, Jayathi Mallikarjuna Temple are the finest examples of ancient Eastern Ganga Dynasty built monuments in the district. The district is bounded on the east by the district of Srikakulam, north by Parvathipuram Manyam south by  Visakhapatnam,  Anakapalli, southeast by the Bay of Bengal, and west by Alluri Sitharama Raju district. It was formed on 1 June 1979, with some parts carved from the neighbouring districts of Srikakulam and Visakhapatnam. The district is named after the princely state of Vizianagaram (Vijaya means victory and Nagaram means city in Telugu). In 2011, it was the least populous district in Andhra Pradesh.

Vizianagaram district was formed on 1 June 1979, as per G.O.Ms.No.700/Revenue (U) Department, dated 15 May 1979 with some parts carved from the neighbouring districts of Srikakulam and Visakhapatnam. The Taluks of Vizianagaram, Gajapathinagaram, Srungavarapukota and a portion of Bheemunipatnam Taluk were transferred from the Visakhapatnam District. The Salur, Bobbili, Parvathipuram and Cheepurupalli Taluks from Srikakulam district were transferred to the new district.

Geography 
It is situated within the geographical co-ordinates of 17- 15’ and 19 – 15’ of the northern latitudes and 83 – 00’ and 83 – 45’ of the eastern longitudes.

The principal rivers flowing in the district are River Nagavali, Suvarnamukhi, Vegavathi, River Champavathi, River Gosthani and Kandivalasa. There are no major irrigation projects in the district. The Denkada Anicut, Thatipudi Reservoir, Andra Reservoir Project, Vegavathi Anicut, Surapadu Anicut, Seethanagaram Anicut, Peda Ankalam Anicut, Vottigedda Reservoir Project, Paradi Anikut, Thotapalli Regulator and Vengala Raya Sagaram Project are the medium irrigation projects. Jhanjavati Project

Climate 
The climate of Vizianagaram district is characterised by high humidity nearly all-round the year with oppressive summer and good seasonal rainfall. The maximum temperature recorded during 2004 is 39.6O C during May and the minimum temperature is 17.1O C during December.I n 2020 
the maximum is 40.1 °C the minimum is 19.11OnormalC

The normal rainfall of the district for the year is 1,131.0 MM as against the actual rainfall of 740.6 MM received during 2002–03. The district gets the benefit of both the South ?West and North- East monsoon.

The average maximum and minimum temperatures and average rainfall recorded in 2004 at Agricultural Research Station, Vizianagaram are given below:

Demographics 
According to the 2011 census, Vizianagaram district has a population of 2,344,474. This gives it a ranking of 193rd in India (out of a total of 640). Its population growth rate over the decade 2001–2011 was 4.16%. Vizianagaram has a sex ratio of 1016 females for every 1000 males, and a literacy rate of 59.49%.

The district had a population of 9,58,778 in 1901. The total population of district increased to 22,49,254 as per 2001 census. They consists of 11,19,541 males and 11,29,713 females. There are 1009 females per 1000 males in the district. The total area is 6,539 square kilometres. The increase in population during the decennium from 1991 to 2001 is 6.55 percent for the district as against 14.6 percent for the Andhra Pradesh State. The Scheduled Caste population is 2,38,023 and Scheduled Tribe population is 2,14,839 which comes to 10.58% and 9.55% respectively to the total population of the district.

The rural population of the district is 18.37 lakhs which comes to 82% of the total population and the urban population is 4.12 lakhs which comes to 18% of the total population. Vizianagaram Town with a population of 1,95,801 is the only Class-I town in the district. There are twelve towns in the district; Vizianagaram, Cheepurupalli, Gajularega, Kanapaka, Bobbili, Parvathipuram, Salur, Sriramnagar, Nellimarla, Kothavalasa, Chintalavalasa, Jarjapupeta and Gajapathinagaram. All the towns are in plain areas of the district.

After bifurcation, the district had a population of 19,30,811, of which 429,764 (22.26%) lived in urban areas. Vizianagaram district had a sex ratio of 1010 females per 1000 males and a literacy rate of 53.21%. Scheduled Castes and Scheduled Tribes made up 2,07,333 (10.74%) and 46,884 (2.43%) of the population respectively. Telugu was the predominant language, spoken by 98.76% of the population.

Household indicators 
In 2007–2008, the International Institute for Population Sciences interviewed 1232 households in 41 villages across the district. They found that 78.7% had access to electricity, 84.1% had drinking water, 18.5% toilet facilities, and 33.9% lived in a pucca (permanent) home. 28.6% of girls wed before the legal age of 18 and 87.3% of interviewees carried a BPL card.

Economy 
In 2006, the Indian government named Vizianagaram one of the country's 250 most backward districts (out of a total of 640). It is one of the thirteen districts in Andhra Pradesh currently receiving funds from the Backward Regions Grant Fund Programme (BRGF).

The primary, secondary and tertiary sectors of the district contribute ,  and  respectively. The major products contributing to the GVA of the district from agriculture and allied services are, sugarcane, paddy, mango, tomato, milk, meat and fisheries. The GVA to the industrial and service sector is contributed from construction, manufacturing, minor minerals, education and ownership of dwellings.

Industry 

Certain famous industries include
 The Ferro Alloys Corporation Limited at Sriramnagar, Garividi
 Jindal Stainless Limited (Ferro Alloys Division), Kothavalasa.
 Andhra Ferro Alloys Limited at Kothavalasa and Garbham

Notable people 

 Kodi Rammurthy Naidu, Indian bodybuilder
 P. Susheela, singer
 Maharajkumar of Vizianagram, Indian cricketer, cricket administrator and politician
 Pusapati Vijayarama Gajapati Raju, Indian parliamentarian and philanthropist
 Praveen Sattaru, film director
 Vidyasagar (composer), music director

Administrative divisions

Mandals 
The below table categorises 28 mandals into their respective revenue divisions in the district:

Parliament segment

Vizianagaram (Lok Sabha constituency), Visakhapatnam (Lok Sabha constituency)

Assembly segments 
The Six Assembly segments of Vizianagaram Lok Sabha and One Assembly segment in Vizak Lok Sabha  constituency are:

Politics 

There are 7 assembly 2 parliamentary constituencies in Vizianagaram district. The parliamentary constituencies includes Visakhapatnam, Vizianagaram . The assembly constituencies in Vizianagaram district are Bobbili, Cheepurupalli, Rajam, Srungavarapukota, Gajapathinagaram, Nellimarla and Vizianagaram. There are 3 revenue divisions, 26 Mandals, 935 Panchayats and 1,551 revenue villages in Vizianagaram district. The revenue divisions are Parvathipuram and Vizianagaram. Vizianagaram parliamentary constituency is represented by the Former Union Civil Aviation Minister Pusapati Ashok Gajapathi Raju.

Towns in District

Municipalities in District

Culture 

The predominant religion is Hinduism. The major festivals are Sankranthi, Ugadi and Rama Navami, Maha Shivaratri, Deepavali, Vinayaka Chavithi, Dasara and Vijayadasami. The nine-day festival celebrations during Rama Navami and Ganesh Chaturthi are very popular in many towns and associated with many cultural events including Stage Dramas, Harikathas, Burra kathas etc. Festivals of Gramadevatha are held annually at Vizianagaram, Bobbili, Salur, Parvathipuram and Sambara with much fanfare. The most popular amongst them is Pydithalli Ammavari Jatra, celebrated at Vizianagaram on the next Tuesday of Vijayadasami day. And also Polamma Jatara, at Sambara in Sambara Village of Makkuva Mandal is a Very much state known famous festival being celebrated in every third week of January. This is a very renowned festival for north andhra people.

The cuisine is strikingly South Indian style with Rice as the staple food accompanied by Dals, Rasam or Sambar, Vegetable Curries, Pickles and Curd.

Transport 
Andhra Pradesh State Road Transport Corporation runs bus services to all the major cities and towns of the state from the district. Major railway stations in the district include Amudalavalasa,  etc. Railway network in the entire district comes under Waltair (Vishakapatnam) division of the South Coast Railway zone. Vizianagaram and Kothavalasa are the main railway junctions. There are 28 railway stations in the district.

National Highways 5 and 43 passes through the district and covers a distance of 200 kilometres. National Highway 43 (India) runs almost entirely in Vizianagaram district for a distance of 83 kilometres and passes through Odisha to Raipur in Chhattisgarh (total length of 551 kilometres). It passes through Vizianagaram, Gajapathinagaram, Ramabhadrapuram and Salur towns. National Highway 5 passes through coastal mandals of Bhogapuram and Pusapatirega. State Highways covers a distance of 122 kilometres, major district roads 852 kilometres and rural roads 781 kilometres.

Tourism 

Ramatheertham is a village panchayat in Nellimarla mandal of Vizianagaram district. It is located 12 km from Vizianagaram city.

Education 
The primary and secondary school education is imparted by government, aided and private schools, under the School Education Department of the state. As per the school information report for the academic year 2015–16, there are a total of 3,875 schools. They include, 85 government, 2,060 mandal and zilla parishads, 1 residential, 618 private, 16 model, 33 Kasturba Gandhi Balika Vidyalaya (KGBV), 112 municipal and 423 other types of schools. The total number of students enrolled in primary, upper primary and high schools of the district are 307,298.

Vizianagaram district has been comparatively backward in the field of education. The literacy rate is 51.82% as against the average of 61.55% for the entire Andhra Pradesh State.

There are 38 Branch Libraries in the district managed by Zilla Granthalaya Samstha. They are located 1–2 in each mandal. There are about 41 book depot centres in the district.
 University college of engineering, JNTU kakinada, vizianagaram. Vizianagaram.
Andhra University Vizianagaram Campus
 Avanthi Institute of Engineering and Technology, Cherukupalli, Bhogapuram.
 Kodi Rama Murthy College of Physical Education, Bobbili.
 Maharajah's Government College of Music and Dance.
 Maharajah's Government Sanskrit College, Vizianagaram
 Maharaj Vijayaram Gajapath Raj College of Engineering, Vizianagaram.
 St. Theressa Institute of Engineering and Technology, Garividi(Cheepurupalli).
 Thandra Paparaya Institute of Science and Technology, Bobbili.
 Maharajah's College
 Sainik School Korukondda

Temples 
There are eleven temples under the management of Endowments Department.

See also 
 List of villages in Vizianagaram district

References

Further reading 
 Handbook of Statistics-Vizianagaram district.2004-2005., Compiled and Published by The Chief Planning Officer, Vizianagaram.

External links 

 Official Vizianagaram District Government Website

 
Districts of Andhra Pradesh
Uttarandhra
1979 establishments in Andhra Pradesh

te:విజయనగరం